Euxesta is a genus of picture-winged flies in the family Ulidiidae.

Species

Euxesta abana
Euxesta abdominalis
Euxesta acuta
Euxesta acuticornis
Euxesta albitarsis
Euxesta alternans
Euxesta andina
Euxesta anna
Euxesta annonae
Euxesta anomalipennis
Euxesta apicalis
Euxesta arcuata
Euxesta argentina
Euxesta armaticornis
Euxesta atlantica
Euxesta atripes
Euxesta avala
Euxesta australis
Euxesta basalis
Euxesta bicolor
Euxesta bifasciata
Euxesta bilimeki
Euxesta binotata
Euxesta brookmani
Euxesta callona
Euxesta cavagnaroi
Euxesta compta
Euxesta conserta
Euxesta contorta
Euxesta diaphana
Euxesta eluta
Euxesta fenestrata
Euxesta fervida
Euxesta freyi
Euxesta fulvicornis
Euxesta galapagensis
Euxesta geminata
Euxesta guianica
Euxesta halterata
Euxesta hendeli
Euxesta hyalipennis
Euxesta insolita
Euxesta juncta
Euxesta junctula
Euxesta knowltoni
Euxesta lacteipennis
Euxesta laffooni
Euxesta leucomelas
Euxesta lunata
Euxesta luteocesta
Euxesta lutzi
Euxesta maculata
Euxesta major
Euxesta minor
Euxesta mitis
Euxesta nesiotis
Euxesta nigricans
Euxesta nitidiventris
Euxesta notata
Euxesta pacifica
Euxesta panamena
Euxesta pechumani
Euxesta penacamposi
Euxesta phoeba
Euxesta prima
Euxesta propinqua
Euxesta pruinosa
Euxesta pulchella
Euxesta punctipennis
Euxesta pusio
Euxesta quaternaria
Euxesta remota
Euxesta riojana
Euxesta rubida
Euxesta sanguinea
Euxesta schineri
Euxesta schnusei
Euxesta schusteri
Euxesta scoriacea
Euxesta scoriacina
Euxesta scutellaris
Euxesta sororcula
Euxesta spodia
Euxesta spoliata
Euxesta stackelbergi
Euxesta stigma
Euxesta stigmatias
Euxesta tenuissima
Euxesta thomae
Euxesta undulata
Euxesta wettsteini
Euxesta willistoni
Euxesta xeres

References

 
Ulidiinae
Brachycera genera